Deuterocopus albipunctatus is a moth of the family Pterophoridae. The species was described by Thomas Bainbrigge Fletcher in 1910. It is known from Japan (Honshu, Shikoku, Kyushu, Tsushima, Yaku-shima), Korea and China.

The length of the forewings is about 7 mm.

The larvae feed on Ampelopsis glandulosa, Vitis thunbergii and Vitis vinifera. They feed on the flower bud, flower and probably the fruit of their host plant. The pupa is generally attached to a flower stalk or petiole of the host plant and directs to the main stem. The pupal period is 8–10 days in September and October. This species spends the winter in the adult stage.

External links
Taxonomic and Biological Studies of Pterophoridae of Japan (Lepidoptera)
Japanese Moths

Deuterocopinae
Moths of Japan